Personal knowledge networks are methods for organizations to identify, capture, evaluate, retrieve, and share information. This method has been primarily conceived by researchers to share personal, informal knowledge between organizations. Instead of looking at the organizational context, some researchers investigate the intra-firm aspects at the personal level of organizational knowledge networks, where knowledge management (KM) processes start and end. Various technologies and behaviors support personal knowledge networking, for example wikis, Really Simple Syndication (RSS) and relationship networks. Researchers propose that knowledge management can occur with little explicit governance. This trend is called "grassroots KM" as opposed to traditional, top-down enterprise KM.

Origin 
New models emerged for the continuous operation of knowledge management. Apart from formal arrangements for official alliances, individuals often know each other and interact beyond official duties, which can lead to knowledge flows and learning.
 Drawbacks of Traditional Knowledge Management
 Traditional Knowledge Management focuses more on technology rather than on social interaction. Organizations should first look to the culture inherent inside, which significantly affects the social interaction among members involved in.
 Technical Support from Social Network
Social software provides an answer to its previous question. It is a means of giving people what they want in terms of their traditional knowledge management activities, in a way that also benefits the firm.

Comparison between KM and PKN

Structural aspect 
 Content-centric vs User-centric
Content-based process is regarded as a major factor which leads to Knowledge Management's incompatibility in the current situation. In contrast, user-based process focuses on each individual in a learning process. That shifts the knowledge's driving force from a content database of organizations to learner(users) themselves. Furthermore, comparing with data or information, knowledge can only be evaluated or managed by individuals, which implies its identical feature.
 Centralized vs Distributed
In PKN model, knowledge learning is undertaken with a high consideration of its natural feature – distributed format. In comparison, the centralized feature has been proved to perform well in guiding an organized and structural learning session. But the well-formatted guidance could hardly satisfy the various and timely requirements of nowadays users.
 Top-down vs Bottom-up
 Top-down models and hierarchical controlled structures are the enemies of innovation. In general, learners, and knowledge workers love to learn, but they hate not to be given the freedom to decide how they learn and work (Cross,2003).  For this fact, a better way in coping with this system is to let them develop and emerge naturally, in a free form way, which could be abstracted to a bottom-up structure.
 Enforcement vs Voluntary
 Traditional KM mainly undertake a pushing model which passively sets the users by simply providing content and expecting the learning process will happen. This model is not sufficient to improve learners' motivation. Considering the dynamic and flexible nature of the learning process, LM, and KM approaches require a shift in emphasis from a knowledge-push to a knowledge-pull model. PKN provides a more attractive platform, where users could locate content only with their needs from information repositories.

Application aspect 
 Personal knowledge search tools instead of searching on the corporate intranet
 Instant messaging and Short Message Service (SMS) instead of telephone or e-mail
 Peer-to-peer file sharing instead of enterprise file servers
 A wiki instead of a team collaboration space
 "Blogging" instead of the enterprise's Web content management

References

 Social networks